My Little Pony: Equestria Girls – Forgotten Friendship is a 2018 Flash animated one-hour television special based on Hasbro's My Little Pony: Equestria Girls toyline and media franchise, which is a spin-off of the 2010 relaunch of Hasbro's My Little Pony toyline. Written and edited by Nick Confalone and directed by Ishi Rudell and Katrina Hadley, it is the first one-hour Equestria Girls special, followed up with Rollercoaster of Friendship (2018),  Spring Breakdown (2019), Sunset's Backstage Pass (2019), and Holidays Unwrapped (2019).

The special aired on Discovery Family on February 17, 2018.

Plot
Sunset Shimmer and her friends, Pinkie Pie, Rarity, Applejack, Rainbow Dash, Fluttershy, and Twilight Sparkle, prepare Canterlot High School's yearbook. At the office, the group meets Wallflower Blush, a meek and quiet girl who has been ignored and forgotten by the school even though she has been there for years. Trixie then appears, demanding that Sunset puts her in the yearbook as "The Greatest and Powerfullest", which Sunset points out is not a real category. Trixie responds that Sunset was selected as "Biggest Meanie" in first year, but Pinkie Pie points out it was because the whole school voted for her in that category as a product of her previous actions as a bully. Angered, Trixie claims that she will have her revenge, before leaving.

The next day, Sunset goes to the beach to hang out with her friends. However, upon arriving, she discovers that most of her friends' memories of her have been erased, with Rarity, Rainbow Dash, Pinkie Pie, Fluttershy and Applejack only remembering her misdeeds as a bully, and Twilight merely remembering the time she yelled at her during the Friendship Games. After failing to convince her friends that she's their friend, she writes to Twilight's pony counterpart a message asking if she remembers her. When Twilight answers positively, Sunset asks her to meet her in Equestria. Once she returns to the pony world, Sunset explains everything to Princess Twilight Sparkle. With no other options avaibable, the two travel to Canterlot to consult Princess Celestia, Sunset's former mentor whom she betrayed before traveling to the human world. Once in Celestia's castle, Sunset apologizes for her actions and the two reconcile, after which they and Twilight go to the castle's library's restricted section to investigate, suspecting Equestrian magic to be behind everything.

After hours of research, Twilight and Sunset find ancient writings about the "Memory Stone", a magical artifact capable of erasing both memories and fragments of memories, and ended up in the human world after Clover the Clever defeated a sorceress using it. Realizing somebody is using the stone to make everyone hate her again, Sunset returns to the human world, where she once again tries to explain her friends everything, only for Trixie to refute her claims. Suspecting Trixie is using the Memory Stone as her revenge for what happened the previous day, Sunset confronts Trixie in the school, only to realize she is innocent. After Sunset explains her situation, Trixie offers her help in exchange of appearing in the yearbook, which Sunset agrees. The two interrogate students throughout the school, but fail to find out anything about the stone or who has it. Meanwhile, in Equestria, Princess Twillight discovers that the stone's effects become permanent if the stone isn't destroyed by the third day after its use, after which she sends a warning to Sunset.

In the school's yearbook office, Sunset reads Princess Twilight's warning, which also includes a drawing of the stone's possible location. Realizing that the drawing is strikingly similar to a picture in Wallflower's screensaver, which Wallflower says she took at the school's garden, Sunset reads her mind and discovers that Wallflower is the culprit, having erased everyone's good memories of Sunset as revenge for her never noticing her. As Wallflower explains her motives, Sunset tries to steal the Memory Stone, but fails. In order to prevent them from trying to take the stone again, Wallflower erases Sunset and Trixie's memories of their meeting, and locks them in the office. However, Sunset had previously recorded everything in a drone Twilight previously made, making the two remember the incident. Trixie then uses one of her stage tricks to help Sunset escape, but is forced to remain behind.

Sunset confronts Wallflower at the school's parking lot, where Wallflower accidentally reveals her actions in front of Sunset's friends. After Sunset fails to reason with her, Wallflower tries to erase all of Sunset's friends' memories of high school, thus destroying their friendship. Sunset, however, jumps in and lets herself getting hit instead, erasing all of her memories of the human world. Touched by her sacrifices, Sunset's friends openly declare her their friend once again. After this, their geodes activate, transforming them into their powered forms, after which they destroy the stone, restoring everybody's memories. The Mane 6 then apologize to Sunset for acting like selfish bullies when they had their memories erased, but Sunset doesn't blame them and is just glad to have them back to normal. Wallflower then apologizes, explaining that she became corrupted by the stone's power after continuously using it to erase embarrassing memories of herself from others, and the group forgives her.

The next day, Sunset informs Princess Twilight of the stone's destruction while thanking her. The school's yearbooks are released, with Trixie discovering that Sunset kept her part of their deal, and Wallflower discovers that her picture as best garderner contains the signatures of Sunset and her friends.

Character Voices
 Rebecca Shoichet - Sunset Shimmer
 Tara Strong - Twilight Sparkle / Princess Twilight Sparkle
 Ashleigh Ball - Rainbow Dash and Applejack
 Andrea Libman - Pinkie Pie and Fluttershy
 Tabitha St. Germain - Rarity and Princess / Vice Principal Luna
 Cathy Weseluck - Spike the Dog
 Shannon Chan-Kent - Wallflower Blush
 Kathleen Barr - Trixie Lulamoon
 Nicole Oliver - Princess Celestia

Minor Character Voices
 Ashleigh Ball - Nurse Redheart
 Ingrid Nilson - Maud Pie
 James Kirk - Micro Chips

Featured Singers
 Rebecca Shoichet - Twilight Sparkle
 Shannon Chan-Kent - Pinkie Pie
 Kazumi Evans - Rarity

Release
Forgotten Friendship premiered on Discovery Family on February 17, 2018. The following month, the special was edited down into a 50-minute original cut of five episodes on Hasbro's YouTube channel. Its first episode was uploaded on March 9, 2018 and its last episode on April 6.

Episodes

Home media and streaming

On October 1, 2018, the special was made available on the Netflix video streaming service in the United States alongside Rollercoaster of Friendship.

It was bundled with Rollercoaster of Friendship and released on DVD on November 1, 2018 in the United Kingdom.

Merchandise
A novelization by author Perdita Finn, titled A Friendship to Remember, was published on December 5, 2017.

Notes

References

External links
 

2018 television specials
2010s animated television specials
Films set on beaches
Films set in schools
Films about parallel universes
Fiction about memory erasure and alteration
Equestria Girls films
Animated crossover television specials